"El Mellao" is the first single by Puerto Rican reggaeton performer Voltio, released in September 2007 by Sony BMG. The female voice has not been revealed on the album printing. The remix features reggaeton artists Ñejo & Dalmata.

Music video 

The music video features a more humorous setting in Puerto Rico. It also features a cameo appearance by Residente of Calle 13, and another appearance by the man who is featured on the single's cover.

Chart performance 
Though not able to chart on any major Billboard chart, the song still managed to peak at number 12 on the Latin Rhythm Airplay chart.

Chart

References 

2007 singles
Julio Voltio songs
Songs written by Julio Voltio
2007 songs